Mamadou Samassa may refer to the following Malian footballers:
Mamadou Samassa (footballer, born 1986), forward for T–Team F.C. in Malaysia
Mamadou Samassa (footballer, born 1990), goalkeeper for Troyes

Mamadou Samassa Mali 1995